The River Banwy is a river about  long in Powys, Wales. It is a tributary of the River Vyrnwy.

The Banwy rises in the hills near the pass which takes the A458 road between Mallwyd and Welshpool. The river is called Nant Cerrig-y-groes at its source near Moel y Llyn. Then flowing east, it joins a number of lesser streams before reaching Pont Twrch near the village of Y Foel, at its confluence with the river Twrch. Two miles further on, it is joined by the river Gam, which flows down from the Nant yr Eira, between Y Foel and Llangadfan.

After flowing past the small village of Llanerfyl, the river meanders between hills of moderate altitude to reach a bridge at Llanfair Caereinion. For the last  of its course it turns northwards through a narrow valley. 'Yr Hafesb' is its local name here. It passes Mathrafal, the seat and court of the kings of Powys. Its confluence with the Vyrnwy is near Newbridge.

References

External links

 ...

Banwy
1Banwy